Bag Durbar, is a palace built and resided by Thapa regime in Kathmandu, the capital of Nepal. The palace complex, located west of the Dharahara and Tundikhel, incorporates an impressive and vast array of courtyards, gardens and buildings. Initially the palace was owned by Amar Singh Thapa (Sardar) of Thapa regime and his descendant but later was occupied by Royals of Shah dynasty, and later by government of Nepal.

History
The palace complex lay in the heart of Kathmandu, to the north of the Bagmati River. The history of the palace is closely linked with the history of Nepal and its rulers.

Under Thapa 

In Royal courtier family Thapa some lived in Thapathali Durbar complex and some lived towards the west of the Sundhara in today's place of Bag Durbar. Initially a palace was built by Amar Singh Thapa (Sanu)and later a new palace was built and used by Bhimsen Thapa due to its close proximity with the Royal Hanuman Dhoka Palace in 1805 CE. After the fall of Bhimsen Thapa in 1837, this entire palace complex was seized by Government of Nepal but was later occupied by Prime Minister Mathabarsingh Thapa as a descendant and member of Bagale Thapa clan. Bag Durbar was again sized Government of Nepal in 1845 after the murder of Mathabarsingh Thapa by his own nephew Jung Bahadur Rana.

Royals of Shah Family
After governmentalization of Bag Durbar this property was given to Royal Prince Upendra Bir Bikram Shah in 1854 and was kept under house arrest for Treason. Upon his death in 1896 BS this palace was inherited by his son Bhupetindra Bikram Shah and again to Bhupitendra's son Mohan Bikram. As Mohan Bikram was RamRaj (Zamindar of Ram Nagar estate) he started living in Ramnagar, India so his property was used by his step brother Chandra Bikram Shah.

Under Rana
Both Mohan Bikram and Chandra Bikram were the father-In-Law of Prime Minister Juddha Shumsher JBR so their property was eventually captured by Juddha and his son Hari Shumsher.

Under Government of Nepal
After the death of the Hari Shumsher as he had many sons Bag Durbar was eventually sold to government of Nepal. Currently the palace is occupied by Kathmandu Metropolitan Office.

Bhimsen Thapa planted huge number of trees, flowers and other greenery plants around the palace so it was called ‘Bag Durbar’.

Earthquake 2015
This Palace was seriously damaged during the April 2015 Nepal earthquake. Currently the Kathmandu Metropolitan Office has started evacuation. The future of the Historical building is unknown.

Gallery

See also
Rana palaces of Nepal
Thapathali Durbar
Jung Bahadur Rana

References

Footnotes

Notes

Thapa palaces of Nepal
Palaces in Kathmandu